Murrieta Rocks originally named Las Tinajas, (The Jars), refers to the waterholes to be found eroded into the Vaqueros Sandstone on top of the outcrop.  The location is at a large outcrop of Vaqueros Sandstone, called Murrieta Rocks, about a mile northeast of Brushy Peak just within the southern bounds of the Rancho Cañada de los Vaqueros in California.  From the east, the outcrop overlooks a spring in an eastern tributary arroyo to the upper Kellogg Creek that flows down from Brushy Peak.

History
Murrieta Rocks was a station on La Vereda del Monte ("The Mountain Trail") used by mesteñeros and horse thieves, most notably the horse gang of Joaquin Murrieta.  It was used as a watering place, a place to hold a supply of relief saddle horses, and occasionally captured mustangs to add to the drove of horses on the route to the south.

References

Diablo Range
Historic trails and roads in California
Geography of Contra Costa County, California
La Vereda del Monte